

Eberhard Rodt (4 December 1895  – 14 December 1979) was a German general during World War II who commanded several divisions. He was a recipient of the  Knight's Cross of the Iron Cross with Oak Leaves of Nazi Germany.

Awards and decorations
 Iron Cross (1914) 2nd Class (30 July 1915) & 1st Class (10 August 1918)
 Clasp to the Iron Cross 2nd Class (21 May 1940) & 1st Class (21 May 1940)
 German Cross in Gold on 23 August 1942 as Oberst in the 22. Schützen-Brigade
 Knight's Cross of the Iron Cross with Oak Leaves
 Knight's Cross on 25 June 1940 as Oberstleutnant and commander of Aufklärungs-Abteilung 25
 Oak Leaves on 28 April 1945 as Generalleutnant and commander of 15. Panzergrenadier-Division

References

Citations

Bibliography

 
 
 

1895 births
1979 deaths
Lieutenant generals of the German Army (Wehrmacht)
Military personnel from Munich
German Army personnel of World War I
Recipients of the Gold German Cross
Recipients of the Knight's Cross of the Iron Cross with Oak Leaves
People from the Kingdom of Bavaria
20th-century Freikorps personnel
German Army generals of World War II
Recipients of the Iron Cross (1914), 1st class